Konstantin Vassiliev ( (born 1970)) is a German composer and guitarist.

Life 
Born in Novoaltaysk, Vasilyev studied guitar at the Novosibirsk Conservatory with Arkadi Burchanow and composition with Sergei Tossin. After graduation he moved to Germany, where he continued his guitar studies with Reinbert Evers at the Hochschule für Musik Detmold, Münster, and his composition studies with Georg Haidu. In 1991, he organised the Chamber Ensemble Vassiliev for a combination of traditional European and Russian folk instruments, for which he wrote many compositions and arrangements.

Together with the singer and reciter Günter Gall, he is also dedicated to the rediscovery of the Jewish poet Mascha Kaléko, who was expelled by the Nazis.

Vasiliev is the winner of the composition competition at the Osnabrück guitar festival "Open Strings".

Work 
 Mountain rhapsody for guitar, A raphsody after a motif by Alban Berg.
 "Den Wolken nach ...".
 Konstantin Vassiliev: Sonata-Fantasy “Smoke of Love” after Shakespeare’s “Romeo and Juliet” und Sonata° auf der CD Sonatas von Roman Viazoskiy, CLCL 102
 Three Lyric Pieces
 Swan Princess
 Wanderer in Time
 Two Russian Pieces (Guitar duet)
 Due immagini animate (Guitar and harp)

Together with Roman Viaszoskiy:
 Fatum
 Forest Paintings: Nr. 1 The Old Oak
 Forest Paintings: Nr. 2 The First Snowdrops
 Forest Paintings: Nr. 3 Dance Of The Forest Ghosts

References

External links 
 
 
 

20th-century classical composers
21st-century classical composers
German classical guitarists
German composers
1970 births
Living people
People from Altai Krai